Nicorinse is a brand of mouthwash formulated to help users quit smoking cigarettes. It was invented by Dr. William Farone. Nicorinse is formulated to reduce the presence and residue of tobacco chemicals in the mouth, including nicotine. Nicorinse was originally launched in North America, then in the United Kingdom in February 2015. Compared to other smoking prevention products, it is notable for not containing nicotine.

References

External links 

 Official Website

Tobacco control
Smoking cessation
Prevention in the United States
American brands
Dentifrices